B-Sides and Rarities (originally referred to as just Rarities on the band's website) is a rarities compilation album by Cake, an alternative rock band from Sacramento, California. It features several cover songs from the 2004 bonus disc Extra Value and the 2005 Wheels EP, including Black Sabbath's "War Pigs" and Barry White's "Never, Never Gonna Give You Up."

Originally, Columbia Records requested the band to release a greatest hits compilation, but the band promptly refused. During the legal fall-out, Cake formed its own record label, Upbeat Records, and released B-Sides and Rarities

A limited edition version of the album features a bonus track, a live version of "War Pigs" featuring Steven Drozd of The Flaming Lips. It also features a scratch and sniff cover with "five different CD cover/scent variations (including red/fresh cut roses, brown/leather, green/fresh cut grass, purple/grape, and yellow/banana )."

Track listing

Personnel
Cake
Vince DiFiore – trumpet, keyboard, harmony vocals
John McCrea –  acoustic guitar, lead vocals
Xan McCurdy – electric guitar, background vocals
Gabe Nelson – bass guitar, keyboard, background vocals

Guest musicians
Paulo Baldi – drums on tracks 4, 10, 11
Greg Brown – guitar, organ on tracks 7, 8, 9
Victor Damiani – bass on tracks 7, 8, 9
Pete McNeal – drums on tracks 1, 2, 3
Tyler Pope – keyboards, guitar on track 5
Todd Roper – drums on tracks 7, 8, 9

Technical personnel
produced, arranged, & mixed by Cake
additional mixing by Patrick Olguin 
mastered by Patrick Olguin at Velvet Tone South, Sacramento, CA
design by Aesthetic Apparatus
CAKE management by Tommy Manzi (for the Umbrella Group) and Lori Turncrantz (for Silent Tribunal LLC)

Appearances in other media
Cake's cover of "Mahna Mahna" appears on the charity CD For the Kids whose proceeds benefit the "VH1 SAVE THE MUSIC" organization.
 "Never, Never Gonna Give You Up"  features in the movie An American Werewolf in Paris.
 Cake's cover of "Strangers in the Night" appears on the PC video game soundtrack Stubbs the Zombie in "Rebel Without a Pulse"
 "Conroy" appears in an episode of CSI: Crime Scene Investigation entitled "The Lost Girls".

References

External links
 
 B-Sides and Rarities on Last.fm

Cake (band) albums
Upbeat Records albums
B-side compilation albums
2007 compilation albums